The 26th Acrobatic Gymnastics European Championships was held in Odivelas, Portugal  16–28 October 2013.

Participating nations

Results

Medal table

References

External links
 
 2013 European Championships in Acrobatic Gymnastics at European Gymnastics
 2013 European Championships: Results at SportsAcrobatics.info

2013
2013 in gymnastics
2013 in Portuguese sport
International gymnastics competitions hosted by Portugal